The English Music Festival (also known as EMF) is an annual four-day event held over the second May bank holiday, dedicated to the performance of British composers from the mediaeval to the present day with a strong focus on the early to mid twentieth century. Founded and organised by Em Marshall in 2006, the Festival takes place in Dorchester on Thames, Oxfordshire and the surrounding area. Now in its seventh year, the festival is rapidly expanding to become one of Britain's major classical music festivals, performing many neglected and previously unperformed works by composers as diverse as Britten and Holst to Joseph Holbrooke and Edwin York Bowen. The festival also presents world premiers by contemporary composers such as Matthew Curtis, Cecilia McDowall, Paul Carr and Tom Rose. EMF's concerts are regularly broadcast by BBC Radio 3, and the festival has established relationships with such orchestras as the BBC Concert Orchestra, the Orchestra of St Paul's and City of London Choir, and artists such as David Owen Norris, James Gilchrist and Janice Watson.

Background and general information 

The EMF held its first festival in October 2006 following a four-year fundraising effort and development by Em Marshall. A founder member (and now Chairman of) the Ralph Vaughan Williams Society (RVW Society), Marshall first conceived of the idea while working at Thames Music Publishing in the late Nineties. The aim of the Festival has been to draw attention to the large amount of neglected, unperformed, and sometimes unpublished works by British composers in the early years of the twentieth Century. Since its inaugural Festival, the EMF has been based in Dorchester Abbey, Dorchester on Thames in Oxfordshire, and concerts are also held in Sutton Courtenay, Radley, and Oxford. The Festival has an average of fifteen concerts a year, and an additional series of fringe talks. The concerts range from small scale recitals to full scale orchestral pieces, and has recently branched into semi staged opera. Attendance has increased greatly as the Festival has progressed.

Funding for the Festival is based entirely on individual supporters and charitable organisation. The Festival receives no government funding as yet.

Vice-presidents of the Festival include Julian Lloyd Webber, Jeremy Irons, and the Marquess of Salisbury.

Future development 

EM Records is the recording arm of the English Music Festival, and was created to fulfil the EMF's aims of celebrating and preserving overlooked works by British composers. EM Records first CD release, produced by Em Marshall, was in March 2011. So far, the recording has been received with enthusiasm by the critics. It features two world premiere recordings together with an unjustly-neglected work. The Violin Sonatas by Arthur Bliss and Henry Walford Davies have languished in manuscript form for over one hundred years, and were performed at the 2010 English Music Festival by regular EMF artists Rupert Marshall-Luck and Matthew Rickard. These works are presented alongside the opulent and darkly turbulent Violin Sonata by York Bowen.

In future the label will produce both recordings of live concerts and specifically recorded work. Plans are already underway for future releases. These include the World Premiere recording of Gustav Holst's The Coming of Christ (which received its first contemporary performance in the 2010 EMF) performed by the City of London Choir under Hilary Davan Wetton; and a recording of Roger Quilter's piano music by David Owen Norris.

Also forthcoming is a live recording, to be made at the 2011 Festival, of part-songs by Rawsthorne and Haydn Wood performed by the Syred Consort under their director, Ben Palmer.

Educating both audiences and children about English music is also part of the EMF mission. The festival has run several education projects, such as joint schools concerts. A current project is still in development.

See also 
 Classical music of the United Kingdom

References

External links 
 English Music Festival Official website
 Official Records Page
 Official Publishing Page
 Official Facebook Page
 Official Twitter Page
 Em Marshall interview
 Albion Magazine article about the EMF

Music festivals established in 2006
English conductors (music)
Classical music festivals in England
Music festivals in Oxfordshire